Christopher John Ashton (born 29 March 1987) is an English rugby union and former rugby league footballer, and one of the few players who have represented England in both rugby codes. A wing or fullback, he joined Leicester Tigers of Premiership Rugby in February 2022.

In 2007 Ashton signed for Northampton Saints in rugby union's Premiership, before moving to Saracens in 2012, Toulon in 2017, Sale in 2018 and Harlequins in 2020. He made his debut for England in March 2010 and played regularly until 2014, including in the 2011 Rugby World Cup, where he finished as the tournament's joint leading try-scorer. After a break of four years, he was recalled to the England squad in November 2018. He won 40 caps for England. In April 2022 he became the record try scorer in Premiership Rugby after scoring a hat trick against Bristol to take him to 95 tries.

Rugby league career

Wigan Warriors
He came through Wigan's scholarship programme and played for Wigan's U18s in 2003. He made his senior debut in Wigan's last match of the 2005 season, and scored two of their seven tries in a 36–22 victory over Huddersfield Giants.

Ashton was brought into the Wigan squad at the start of 2006 as replacement for the injured Kris Radlinski. He was one of the most consistent players for Wigan during their disappointing Super League XI season and was a contender for the Young Player of the Year award. He finished the 2006 season with 15 tries from 29 appearances making him the leading try scorer for Wigan. Ashton was given the number 1 shirt, previously worn by Radlinski, at the start of 2007 despite the arrival of former Bradford Bulls full back Michael Withers.

Ashton made 52 appearances in total for the Cherry and Whites, scoring 30 tries.

International
Ashton was selected for the 2004 Academy Origin Series and the 2004 victorious England Academy U-18s tour to Australia.

Although some criticisms were made about his defensive abilities, he earned a call into the England squad at the end of 2006 while Great Britain were on tour in Australia and New Zealand. Ashton made his England debut against France on 22 October 2006 in the Federation Shield tournament. He played in all four Federation Shield matches, which concluded with England winning the competition, and he scored three tries in his four games.

Rugby union career

Northampton Saints

On 19 March 2007 it was announced that Ashton had signed to play rugby union for Northampton Saints, after Wigan granted him an early release from his contract.

On 1 September 2007, Ashton made his debut for Northampton at Franklin's Gardens as a late substitute for Will Harries against London Welsh in National Division One. He scored his first try for the club, with his first touch of the ball, in the same game which Saints won 44–11.

The following week he scored for Northampton's second team, Northampton Wanderers. and a substitute scoring appearance against Moseley.

In 2008, Ashton broke the National Division One try scoring record, scoring 39 tries (and one conversion) from only 25 appearances.

Despite a relatively disappointing 2008–09 season, with many appearances in the Wanderers and struggling to make it into the first team regularly, in the 2009–10 season Ashton embarked on a run of form that brought 15 tries in 16 games in all competitions including Heineken Cup efforts against Munster and Perpignan.

Ashton was named as the Premiership player of the season for 2009–10.

On 19 January 2012, it was announced that Ashton had signed with Saracens, and joined up with his 
new team for the start of the 2012–13 season.

Saracens

Ashton's Saracens contract was rumoured to be worth £250,000 per season. On 1 September 2012, he made his Saracens debut against London Irish. He scored two tries on his début, in a game which Saracens won 40–3.

Saracens finished the 2012–13 regular season at the top of the table, 3 points ahead of Leicester Tigers. However, in the play-offs they lost their semi-final match against Northampton, Ashton's former club, by 13 points to 27. Ashton scored a total of 6 tries that season.

In the 2013–14 season, Saracens again finished the regular season as league leaders, 9 points clear of Northampton. They then won their semi-final against Harlequins, including a try from Ashton in the 61st minute. However, in a hard-fought final at Twickenham they again lost to Northampton, by 20 points to 24. Ashton finished the season joint-4th in the try scoring table, with a total of 8 tries.

In the 2014–15 Premiership season, Saracens qualified for the play-offs in 4th place, with the same number of points as Exeter Chiefs (68), but taking the 4th spot on account of losing one less game than Exeter. In the semi-final Saracens again came up against Northampton, with the added disadvantage of playing away at Franklin's Gardens. However Saracens produced a strong defensive performance, with fly-half Owen Farrell producing an impressive kicking display, which saw Saracens win 29 points to 24. Ashton was on the replacements' bench.

In the final at Twickenham, Saracens played Bath, who had a strong set of backs, all of whom were England internationals, and were expected to be tough opponents. However, Bath's challenge faltered as Saracens established early control of the game and did not lose the lead, eventually winning 28–16. Ashton came on as a substitute in the 60th minute.

Ashton's strong performances throughout the season meant he finished in joint-2nd place on the try scoring tables with 13 tries, the same as fellow Saracens winger Chris Wyles, behind Exeter Chiefs forward Thomas Waldrom. Ashton's impressive form led to him being called back up to the England training squad for the 2015 Rugby World Cup, which was held in England throughout September–October, although he was not selected in the final 31-man squad for the tournament.

In the 2015-16 season Ashton helped Saracens to both the Premiership title and the European Rugby Champions Cup, starting both finals. In the 2016-17 season Ashton helped Saracens retain their European Rugby Champions Cup title, scoring a try in the final against Clermont.

Ashton received a 10-week ban in 2016 for eye-gouging; an appeal against the ban was dismissed. In September 2016 Ashton received a 13-week ban for biting Saints' Alex Waller in a premiership match on 17 September. He was free to play again on 19 December.

Toulon
In October 2016, Ashton signed for French club Toulon in the Top 14 from the 2017–18 season. Ashton played a single season in the Top 14, scoring 24 tries in 23 appearances to break the tryscoring record previously held by Napolioni Nalaga.

Sale Sharks
On 3 July 2018 it was confirmed that Ashton was to return to England when he signed for Sale Sharks for the 2018–19 season.

Ashton left the club by mutual consent on 2 March 2020.

Harlequins
On 4 March 2020, after his contract was terminated by Sale Sharks, Ashton signed for Harlequins. Head of rugby Paul Gustard described him as "without doubt one of the most competitive, professional and dedicated athletes" he had come across.

Worcester Warriors
On 25 January 2021, Ashton was granted early release from Harlequins as he joins with Premiership rivals Worcester Warriors with immediate effect until the end of the 2021-22 season. On 13 December 2021, Worcester Warriors confirmed that Ashton had left the club by mutual consent.

Leicester Tigers
Ashton joined Leicester in February 2022 and made his debut against former club Northampton Saints on 12 February 2022, he made a try saving tackle while on during Freddie Burns' first half Head Injury Assessment, but was then sin binned in the 70th minute after replacing Guy Porter just 3 minutes earlier.  Ashton scored his first try for Leicester against London Irish on 12 March 2022, then on 27 March 2022 he scored two tries in Leicester's win against Exeter Chiefs. The second of these tied the Premiership Rugby try scoring record on 92. On 30 April 2022, Ashton scored three tries against Bristol Bears to take the Premiership Rugby record outright with 95 tries.

Ashton started the 2022 Premiership Rugby final as Tigers beat his former side Saracens 15-12.

International 

England manager Martin Johnson called Ashton up to the senior squad for the 2010 Six Nations.

Ashton made his England debut against France on 20 March 2010 in Paris. He played left wing, the opposite side to his usual position with Northampton. He gave the scoring pass to fellow Saints player fullback Ben Foden, who was also making his first Six Nations start.

Although England lost the first Test, they won the second 20–21. Ashton scored his first international try in this match. On 13 November 2010, England defeated Australia at Twickenham. Ashton was the hero of the match with two tries in a 35–18 victory, the second after a run from inside the England's 22-metre line.

Ashton scored two tries in England's opening match in the 2011 Six Nations against Wales at the Millennium Stadium on 4 February, with England winning the game 26–19. He followed this with four tries against Italy the following week, equalling the all-time Six Nations record with six tries in a season. This performance also meant he is the first person in the Six Nations to score four tries in a single match. His famous swallow dive celebration was used to celebrate two of these tries.

Ashton represented England at the 2011 Rugby World Cup in New Zealand and finished as the tournament's joint leading try-scorer with six.

He started all five matches for England in the 2012 Six Nations, and in May 2012 scored a hat-trick of tries as England beat the Barbarians 57–26 in a non-cap fixture at Twickenham. Ashton went on the 2012 summer tour to South Africa in which he started all three Test matches.

Ashton started all five matches for England in the 2013 Six Nations Championship, scoring a try in the first match against Scotland. England took the championship down to the final game against Wales, however suffered a heavy 30–3 defeat at the Millennium Stadium as Wales took the title. Ashton later played in all three of England's matches in the 2013 autumn internationals, scoring a try in their win over Argentina.

Ashton lost his place in the England elite squad, not playing in any of their games in the 2014 Six Nations. He did however play in England's mid-year games against the All Blacks in New Zealand, all three of which England lost. Again, Ashton's defensive capabilities were the subject of much discussion during this campaign and he did not play for England during the 2014 autumn internationals or 2015 Six Nations.

However, during Saracens' ultimately winning campaign in the 2014–15 premiership season, Ashton consistently performed at a high level and this promising form resulted in Stuart Lancaster recalling him back into the England camp, including him in his 50-man training squad for that year's 2015 World Cup, alongside fellow Saracens winger David Strettle, who had not played for England since 2008. Ashton was the subject of much media focus during England's World Cup training programme. Ashton was dropped from the squad some 6 weeks before the tournament.

Following England's disappointing campaign at their home World Cup, failing to make it out of the pool stages as they lost to both Wales and Australia, Stuart Lancaster stepped down as England head coach and was replaced by Eddie Jones.

Jones began making some immediate changes to the England elite squad, including dropping several long-standing players and adding a number of new or returning players. This included Chris Ashton, who was named in the squad for the upcoming 2016 Six Nations Championship. However, Ashton was subsequently given a 10-week ban by the RFU for eye-gouging Luke Marshall during an ERCC match between Saracens and Ulster. Although Ashton appealed the ban, this was rejected and he therefore missed the entire 2016 Six Nations tournament and several games for Saracens.

A subsequent 13-week ban for biting also ruled Ashton ineligible for selection for the 2016 Autumn internationals.

Ashton's decision to join Toulon in October 2016 appeared to end his hopes of an England recall, as he would not be eligible for selection by playing outside England. However, he returned to England with Sale next year, notably after winning a game against England with the Barbarians at Twickenham in May 2018, scoring a hat trick in a performance that saw England conceding a record points total at Twickenham. This game might have brought Ashton much closer to coming back in Eddie Jones' squad.

Later in 2018, after being banned for seven weeks for a tip tackle in August 2018, was selected in the England squad for the Autumn internationals. In November 2018, he made his first England appearance in four years, coming off the bench in their 12–11 win over South Africa, before being named in the starting fifteen against New Zealand.

International statistics
NH = Tournament not held

Rugby league

Rugby union

International tries

Club statistics

DQ = Club did not qualify

Rugby league

Rugby union

Playing style
Ashton's support play, which he learnt during his days as a rugby league footballer, has been praised and is often cited as the main reason that he is such a prolific try scorer.
Another of Ashton's key attributes is his speed, which he demonstrated by scoring a 90-metre try against Australia in the autumn of 2010, when he outran Drew Mitchell and James O'Connor, two of Australia's fastest wingers.

When Ashton scores, he often performs a 'swallow dive', which has been nicknamed the 'Ash splash'. He has been praised and rebuked in equal measure for it, with critics concerned about the risk of dropping the ball in the act of scoring.

References

External links

(archived by web.archive.org) Profile Northampton Saints
(archived by web.archive.org) Profile England - RFU.com
(archived by web.archive.org) Career Stats Statbunker

1987 births
Living people
Barbarian F.C. players
Dual-code rugby internationals
England international rugby union players
England national rugby league team players
English rugby union players
Harlequin F.C. players
Northampton Saints players
Leicester Tigers players
Rugby league players from Wigan
Rugby union players from Wigan
Rugby union wings
Sale Sharks players
Wigan Warriors players
Worcester Warriors players